Fagerhult is a locality situated in Högsby Municipality, Kalmar County, Sweden with 229 inhabitants in 2010.

References

External links 

Populated places in Kalmar County
Populated places in Högsby Municipality